The Admiral: Roaring Currents, or simply The Admiral, is a 2014 South Korean epic action-war film directed and co-written by Kim Han-min. Based on the historical Battle of Myeongnyang, it stars an ensemble cast led by Choi Min-sik as the Korean naval commander Yi Sun-sin. The film was released theatrically in South Korea on July 30, 2014.

The film recorded 10 million admissions only 12 days after its premiere and set a record in South Korea for achieving such a high number of viewers in the shortest amount of time.

Plot
The film revolves around the titular Battle of Myeongnyang around 1597, which is regarded as one of legendary Joseon Admiral Yi Sun-sin's most remarkable naval victories. He led only 12 ships, which remained in his command, to a heroic victory against an invading Japanese fleet of 333 vessels.

At the onset of the battle at their base in Haenam, the Japanese invaders under Tōdō Takatora are confident that their planned expedition to Hansong to capture King Seonjo will meet with success. However, they remain reserved over the news that Joseon's greatest admiral, Yi Sun-sin, has been restored to his former command after the disaster at Chilcheollyang, which has reduced the Korean navy to a mere dozen battle-ready ships. To ensure the success of the operation, Hideyoshi sends one of his finest naval war leaders to Joseon, Kurushima Michifusa, the commander of the Murakami Clan Navy who is an expert in naval combat but enjoys a shaky reputation among his fellow daimyō as a pirate. One of the admirals of the Japanese Left Army, Wakizaka, first meets Kurushima and his lieutenant, Kimura, while he finishes off the remnants of a group of Joseon soldiers. He especially distrusts Kurushima and draws his sword on him several times, especially after the latter insults him by shaming his defeat at Hansan Island. Later, Kurushima and Haru, his sharpshooter, drink sake as Kurushima elaborates on his personal vendetta against Yi Sun-sin, stating that his brother Michiyuki had been killed by the latter earlier in the war.

In the meantime, Yi Sun-sin is facing the despair mounting among his officers and troops. Facing an enemy force that far outnumbers them and seeing no reasonable chance of success in the inevitable clash even with one single turtle ship remaining, many consider the fight lost before it has even started. Despite his outwardly indifferent demeanor, Yi is hard-pressed to maintain morale among his men and desperate to find a solution for his problem. However, the breaking point seems reached when General Bae Seol, the deserter of Chilcheollyang, burns the turtle ship and has his men try to assassinate Yi. Although Yi escapes and Bae is killed for his act of treachery, the ship is lost, which boosts confidence among the Japanese and further dispirits Yi's troops. To seek an answer, Yi travels to the Myeongnyang Strait, an area notorious for its strong and treacherous currents, which the Japanese intend to cross on their way to Hansong. Later, he confides in his son Hoe that to win the fight, he must turn the fear paralyzing his men into courage.

Upon hearing that the departure of the Japanese attack fleet is imminent, Yi abandons his base and moves to Usuyeong after burning the naval facilities to the ground. The next morning, Yi's fleet arrives in the strait and is shortly met by the Japanese, who are using the morning tide to move into the channel, with Kurushima leading the vanguard. Yi engages Kurushima's fleet in battle, but as the other Korean commanders are still hesitant to involve themselves, Yi's flagship is quickly surrounded and attacked by boarding parties. In the apparently hopeless situation, Yi commands several cannons to be fired from the rower deck's port hatches in a concentrated volley, to use their recoil to blast the ship free of its encirclement. As Yi had hoped, this bold act of survival inspires the rest of his countrymen to take the fight to the enemy.

When the tide turns and forms a whirlpool in the middle of the channel, thus solidifying Yi's defensive position, Kurushima orders an all-out attack with the rest of his ships. Despite the efforts of Haru and a ship loaded with black powder charges, the renewed courage of the Koreans prevails, though heavy sacrifices are made. Kurushima's desperate situation is observed by Todo, who merely laughs at Katō's suggestion of reinforcing him. Kurushima, realizing that he is now on his own, boards the Korean flagship but is decapitated by Yi himself after he takes several arrows from Korean archers, and his head is hung from the tip of the ship's mast.

When Yi's ship itself is caught in the whirlpool, his civilian navy servants and local fishermen courageously drag the vessel back to safety. Joined by the rest of the fleet, Yi leads a counterattack which deals the Japanese forces a crushing blow, forces them into retreat, and leaves the Koreans triumphant. The film ends with the reminiscence to the first encounter of the Japanese with the turtle ship in 1592.

Historical background 

In the 16th century, General Toyotomi Hideyoshi unified Japan, and the long civil war in Japan was ended. At that time, most Koreans did not think about any possibility of invasion from Japan and ignored its readiness for war. Therefore, the army and the navy except for Admiral Yi Sun Sin were not prepared for any invasion from Japan. Only Admiral Yi Sun Sin prepared for a war against Japan by building up ships and developing weapons. In 1592, the Imjin War broke out when Japan invaded Korea. From the beginning of the war, the Japanese army, which were well experienced as a result of their civil war, were easily defeating the Korean army and quickly advancing to the north. However, at sea, Admiral Yi Sun Sin's Joseon Navy destroyed the Japanese naval fleets in consecutive battles. This stifled the Japanese advance through the Korean Peninsula, and cut off the sea lines necessary for resupplying the army.

However, in 1597, due to a Japanese espionage plot and political conspiracy in the Korean royal court, Admiral Yi Sun Sin was imprisoned by the Korean government and another admiral (Won Gyun) was appointed to command the Korean navy. Admiral Won, in his first and last naval engagement, attacked the Japanese navy but was seriously defeated by Japan and lost most of the warships, more than 200 of them. Won was killed in action.

After that defeat, the Korean government released Yi and put him back in the position of admiral, but the fleet consisted of only 12 warships because of the prior defeat. The Korean government suggested that Yi forgo sea warfare and join any land-based battle. However, Yi believed that he should instead prevent the Japanese navy from advancing via the sea. He knew that not everything consisted in the number of ships, but a correct strategy would give him the victory although he did not count on the support of his men. He did not let himself be overcome and he overcame the fear. In October 1597, a Japanese fleet of 330 ships tried to attack the small Korean fleet of 12 ships.

As the Japanese moved toward the Korean fleet, Admiral Yi enticed the Japanese fleet to a long and narrow strait with a fast and strong current. He also hampered the Japanese fleet's navigating by blocking the strait with steel chains. (Whether that actually happened is uncertain.) Therefore, many Japanese ships were gathered and stuck in the narrow strait, as the tide turned.

The cannons on Korean warships outside the strait bombarded the Japanese ships. The Japanese fleet, having lost more than 31 warships, retreated to the east, and it finally gave up advancing toward the west by sea.

Cast

 Choi Min-sik as Yi Sun-sin
 Ryu Seung-ryong as Kurushima Michifusa
 Cho Jin-woong as Wakisaka Yasuharu
 Kim Myung-gon as Tōdō Takatora
 Jin Goo as Lim Jun-young, Yi Sun-sin's scout
 Lee Jung-hyun as Mrs. Jeong, Lim's wife
 Kwon Yul as Yi Hoe, Yi Sun-sin's son
 No Min-woo as Haru
 Kim Tae-hoon as Kim Jung-geol
 Lee Seung-joon as Captain Ahn
 Ryohei Otani as Junsa, a Japanese defector and spy for Yi Sun-sin
 Park Bo-gum as Bae Su-bong
 Kim Won-hae as Bae Seol
 Kim Kang-il as Katō Yoshiaki
 Lee Hae-yeong as Captain Song
 Jang Jun-nyeong as Lieutenant Nah
 Moon Yeong-dong as Kim Dol-son
 Yoo Soon-woong as Elder Kim
 Kim Gil-dong as Captain Hwang
 Choi Deok-moon as Captain Song
 Park No-sik as Captain Kim
 Kim Hyeon-tae as Ok-hyeong
 Kang Tae-young as Kimura
 Kim Gu-taek as Bae Hong-suk
 Joo Seok-tae as Katsura
 Jo Bok-rae as Oh Sang-goo
 Go Kyung-pyo as Oh Duk-yi
 Nam Kyung-eup as Kwon Yul

Release

Dates

Credits 
 CJ Entertainment (2014) (Korea) (theatrical)
 Big Stone Picture (2014) (Korea) (theatrical)
 Cj Entertainment (2014) (Korea) (theatrical)
 CJ CGV Viet Nam (2014) (Vietnam) (theatrical)
 CJ Entertainment America (2014) (USA) (theatrical)
 CJ Entertainment America (2014) (USA) (theatrical) (subtitled)
 CJ Entertainment (2014) (Worldwide) (theatrical)
 Min Gyo Tour (2014) (Australia) (theatrical)
 Viva International Pictures (2015) (Philippines) (theatrical)
 Madman Entertainment (2015) (Australia) (DVD)
 New KSM (2015) (Germany) (DVD)
 Twin Co. Ltd. (2015) (Japan) (DVD)

Festivals

Reception

Box office

South Korea 
The Admiral: Roaring Currents drew 682,882 viewers on its first day in theaters on July 30, 2014, grossing . This was the all-time highest opening day box office in South Korea, for both a foreign and domestic film, breaking the previous record set by Kundo: Age of the Rampant.

By August 15, The Admiral: Roaring Currents became the all-time most-watched film in South Korea, breaking the previous record held by Hollywood blockbuster Avatar (13.62 million). By August 17, it became the first film to sell more than 14 million tickets in South Korean theaters and the first domestic film to exceed the  mark. At 17,607,820 admissions, it has grossed  in South Korea.

 Korean Box Office Chart :  

 Regional Total Viewers and Income  

International 
It opened in limited release across 30 theaters in North America, beginning August 15, 2014. Due to favorable reviews from critics and moviegoers, it expanded to 42 theaters on its second week, and its first week gross of  surpassed the previous record held by Masquerade as the highest-grossing film directly distributed by a South Korean distributor. The film has grossed  in China,  in the United States, and  internationally.

 Critical response 

 Positive  
 Naval battle scene
Korean Economies' Song Ji-hyun said, "61 minutes of naval battle scene was not boring at all."
 Seoul Economies' Choi Su-moon said, "By only showing navy's efforts not chains, like a theory from historians, it upgraded the movie's quality."
 Heo Ji-woong, in Seol Jeon, said that "61 minutes of naval battle scene is hard to figure out in Hollywood, and it was great."
 Amazing casts and acting ability
SBS funE's Kim Ji-hye said, "Nice casting and amazing acting ability upgraded the movie's quality. Actors feelings were well delivered."

 Negative 
 No-cut News' Kim Hyun-shik said, "Because it only followed history, there is no impact, although there are romance going on."
 MBN Yoo Myung-joon said that "The movie was so focused on Korean navy, especially Yi Sun-sin, and Japanese navy seemed insignificant."

Awards and nominations

Sequels

In 2013, while producing The Admiral: Roaring Currents, Big Stone Pictures revealed their plans to produce two more films related to Yi Sun-sin, depending on the success of The Admiral and following the box office success of The Admiral,  production of the sequels were confirmed as a trilogy of films by Kim Han-min.

The second film of the trilogy, titled Hansan: Rising Dragon based on Battle of Hansan Island with Park Hae-il starring as Yi Sun-sin, is scheduled to be released in July 2022. A third film titled Noryang'' is based on Battle of Noryang.

References

External links 
 
 
 
 
 

2014 films
2010s historical adventure films
2010s action war films
South Korean historical action films
South Korean action drama films
South Korean historical adventure films
South Korean war drama films
2010s Korean-language films
Films about Japan–Korea relations
Films about naval warfare
Films set in the Joseon dynasty
Films set on ships
War adventure films
Action films based on actual events
War films based on actual events
Cultural depictions of Yi Sun-sin
2010s South Korean films
Films about the Japanese invasions of Korea (1592–1598)